Sullivan County is a county in the U.S. state of New Hampshire. As of the 2020 census, the population was 43,063, making it the second-least populous county in New Hampshire. Its county seat is Newport.

Sullivan County is included in the Claremont-Lebanon, NH-VT Micropolitan Statistical Area.

History
Sullivan County was organized at Newport in 1827 from the northern portion of Cheshire County. It is named for John Sullivan (1740–1795), the Revolutionary War hero and a former governor.

Geography
It is the third-smallest county in New Hampshire by area.

Adjacent counties
 Grafton County (north)
 Merrimack County (east)
 Hillsborough County (southeast)
 Cheshire County (south)
 Windham County, Vermont (southwest)
 Windsor County, Vermont (west)

National protected area
 Saint-Gaudens National Historic Site

Demographics

2000 census
At the 2000 census, there were 40,458 people, 16,530 households and 11,174 families living in the county. The population density was 29/; (75/sq mi). There were 20,158 housing units at an average density of 38 per square mile (14/km2). The racial makeup of the county was 97.99% White, 0.24% Black or African American, 0.29% Native American, 0.37% Asian, 0.02% Pacific Islander, 0.14% from other races, and 0.94% from two or more races. 0.55% of the population were Hispanic or Latino of any race. 16.9% were of English, 14.7% French, 11.7% French Canadian, 10.7% American, 10.0% Irish, 6.2% German and 5.1% Italian ancestry. 96.1% spoke English and 1.6% French as their first language.

There were 16,530 households, of which 29.40% had children under the age of 18 living with them, 54.70% were married couples living together, 8.60% had a female householder with no husband present, and 32.40% were non-families. 25.70% of all households were made up of individuals, and 10.90% had someone living alone who was 65 years of age or older. The average household size was 2.41 and the average family size was 2.88.

23.90% of the population were under the age of 18, 6.40% from 18 to 24, 28.00% from 25 to 44, 25.90% from 45 to 64, and 15.80% who were 65 years of age or older. The median age was 40 years. For every 100 females there were 97.10 males. For every 100 females age 18 and over, there were 93.50 males.

The median household income was $40,938 and the median family income was $48,516. Males had a median income of $32,185 versus $24,615 for females. The per capita income for the county was $21,319. About 5.20% of families and 8.50% of the population were below the poverty line, including 9.50% of those under age 18 and 8.80% of those age 65 or over.

2010 census
As of the 2010 United States census, there were 43,742 people, 18,126 households, and 12,025 families living in the county. The racial makeup of the county was 97.0% white, 0.6% Asian, 0.4% black or African American, 0.3% American Indian, 0.3% from other races, and 1.4% from two or more races. Those of Hispanic or Latino origin made up 1.1% of the population. In terms of ancestry, 23.9% were English, 16.3% were Irish, 9.2% were German, 7.1% were Italian, 6.0% were French Canadian, 5.2% were Scottish, 5.1% were Polish, and 4.4% were American.

Of the 18,126 households, 28.5% had children under the age of 18 living with them, 51.3% were married couples living together, 9.9% had a female householder with no husband present, 33.7% were non-families, and 26.1% of all households were made up of individuals. The average household size was 2.37 and the average family size was 2.82. The median age was 43.9 years.

The median income for a household in the county was $50,689 and the median income for a family was $61,959. Males had a median income of $44,408 versus $34,233 for females. The per capita income for the county was $26,322. About 7.5% of families and 10.0% of the population were below the poverty line, including 12.6% of those under age 18 and 7.9% of those age 65 or over.

Politics and government

|}

County Commission
The executive power of Sullivan County's government is held by three county commissioners, each representing one of the three commissioner districts within the county.
 

In addition to the County Commission, there are five directly elected officials: they include County Attorney, Register of Deeds, County Sheriff, Register of Probate, and County Treasurer.

General court
The general court delegation from Sullivan County is made up of all of the members of the New Hampshire House of Representatives from the county. In total there are 13 members from 11 different districts. The party distribution of representatives after the 2022 elections is as follows.

Communities

City
 Claremont

Towns

 Acworth
 Charlestown
 Cornish
 Croydon
 Goshen
 Grantham
 Langdon
 Lempster
 Newport (county seat)
 Plainfield
 Springfield
 Sunapee
 Unity
 Washington

Census-designated places
 Charlestown
 Newport
 Plainfield

Other populated places
 Balloch
 Cornish Flat
 East Lempster
 Georges Mills
 Guild
 Meriden
 South Acworth

Geographical features

Lakes 

 Ashuelot Pond
 Eastman Pond
 Highland Lake
 Lake Sunapee
 Little Sunapee Lake

Mountains 
 Lovewell Mountain
 Mount Sunapee

County services
The Sullivan County Department of Corrections operates the county prison in the town of Unity.

See also
 National Register of Historic Places listings in Sullivan County, New Hampshire

References

External links
 Sullivan County official website
 Sullivan County, NH, Court Records, 1819-1859 at Dartmouth College Library

 
1827 establishments in New Hampshire
Populated places established in 1827